The Mary Valley Rattler (formerly Mary Valley Heritage Railway) is a heritage railway line that conducts steam train trips and tours from Gympie through the Mary Valley using the former Mary Valley railway line in the Gympie Region, Queensland, Australia.  It is now one of the region's biggest tourist attractions and is managed by a not-for-profit organisation.  It has been described as Australia's third biggest heritage railway. It was shut down for safety reasons in 2012. In 2016, the Gympie Regional Council provided funding to make the railway operational again as it is a major tourist attraction for the area. Journeys recommenced between Gympie and Amamoor on 6 October 2018.

Railway history
The Mary Valley railway line was a branch line of the North Coast railway line, which branched west at Monkland (just south of Gympie) and continued to Brooloo in the upper Mary Valley. It was constructed between 1911 and April 1915 to facilitate closer settlement of the Mary River valley. The line reached Kandanga railway station in February 1914 and the terminus of Brooloo in April 1915. However, the extension was never constructed.

By the 1970s, the line became increasingly unprofitable due to the economic impact on the dairying industry of lower butter consumption due to competition of margarine and the loss of the British export market when the UK entered the European Economic Community. The Wide Bay Co-Operative Butter Factory in Gympie (Australia's largest butter factory in 1925) closed in May 1978 after nearly 80 years of operation. In 1988, staff were withdrawn from Imbil, Amamoor and Dagun stations, with some railway buildings such as goods sheds and residences sold for removal. The pineapple industry lobbied successfully to keep the line operational until 1995. The Mary Valley Heritage Railway Board proposed to operate a tourist train on the line in 1996 using volunteers and trainees. The tourist train service commenced on 23 May 1998.

In 2010, the Department of Employment, Economic Development and Innovation conducted a review of the operations of the railway. It found the railway was operating at a significant economic loss and was dependent on grant income. In 2011, concerns were raised about the safety of the line, but government inspectors found no significant safety issues. When 2010-11 Queensland floods closed roads in the area, the railway was used as a shuttle service. Some of the line crossings had a five km/h speed limit with the top speed limited to 25 km/h.

After two very serious derailments during August and September 2012, the limitations and state of the railway company's finances became known. It was shut down indefinitely by the Department Transport & Main Roads, as it was declared unsafe to convey passengers. Following flood damage in 2013, the railway disbanded. In June 2016, the Gympie Regional Council allocated $250,000 for operational start-up costs and $3.8 million for capital funds to restart the Rattler.

Tours & Timetables

Mary Valley Heritage Railway (1993-2013)
"Ride The Rattler" scenic tours were operated by the Mary Valley Heritage Railway (MVHR) every Saturday, Sunday and Wednesday from the historic Gympie Railway Station. This historic 40 km journey commences at Gympie, and after crossing the Mary River, negotiates an abundance of curves, gradients and bridges to pass through the small country villages of Dagun, Amamoor and Kandanga to Imbil.

The steam train, pulled by a fully restored C17 class locomotive from the early 1920s, departed Gympie station at 10 am. The Gympie Station itself dates back to pre-1880. As the train travels south, it passes through the southern end of the city of Gympie.

After crossing the Mary River, the railway line enters the Mary Valley. The line wanders away from the river to negotiate the valleys of some of its main tributaries, including the Yabba, Kandanga and Amamoor Creeks. In this area, there are a number of curves, gradients and bridges as the train heads towards the station of Kandanga.

The country village of Kandanga was established in 1910 to service patrons travelling on the proposed Mary Valley line which became operational as far as Kandanga in 1914. The original Kandanga railway station, now restored to its former glory, contains an interesting pictorial record of the history of the Mary Valley line.

Travelling through to Imbil, the line traverses an interesting gorge section through mainly timbered country, before reaching a short tunnel that pierces a ridge of coastal ranges. The track then descends quickly to the line's largest town, Imbil. The Imbil Railway Bridge over Yabba Creek was constructed between 1911 and 1915.

Mary Valley Rattler (2018-present)
As of March 2021, heritage journeys operated by a C17 steam locomotive run on Wednesdays, Saturdays and Sundays, departing from Gympie Railway Station, travelling to Dagun and Amamoor. On Thursdays, a railmotor dining and tasting tour is operated by RM76.

The railway also runs various events throughout the year.

Fleet

Steam Locomotives

Historical steam locomotive fleet

Diesel locomotives

Heritage Listings
The Mary Valley Rattler has a number of heritage-listed sites, including:
 Kandanga; Amamoor; Melawondi Stations; Mary Valley Branch Railway: Mary Valley Railway Cream Sheds
 Over Yabba Creek: Imbil Railway Bridge

See also;

Rail transport in Queensland

References

Further reading
 The Mary Valley Branch Line Milne, Rod Australian Railway Historical Society Bulletin, December 1996 pp. 363–374.

External links
Details & photos of railway
Mary Valley Rattler website
Mary Valley Heritage Railway website (archived)

Railway lines in Queensland
Railway lines opened in 1914
Wide Bay–Burnett
Tourist attractions in Queensland
1914 establishments in Australia
Tourist railways in Queensland